Lorenzo Gavotti, C.R. (1595–1679) was a Roman Catholic prelate who served as Titular Archbishop of Rhodus (1670–1679), Apostolic Nuncio to Switzerland (1643–1646), and Bishop of Ventimiglia (1633–1653).

Biography
Lorenzo Gavotti was born in 1595 in Savona, Italy and ordained a priest in the Congregation of Clerics Regular of the Divine Providence.
On 20 Jun 1633, he was appointed during the papacy of Pope Urban VIII as Bishop of Ventimiglia; he served in the position until his resignation on 27 Jan 1653.
On 10 Jul 1633, he was consecrated bishop by Giovanni Battista Scanaroli, Titular Bishop of Sidon, with Angelo Cesi, Bishop of Rimini, and Giovanni della Robbia (bishop), Bishop of Bertinoro, serving as co-consecrators. 
On 28 Oct 1643, he was appointed during the papacy of Pope Urban VIII as Apostolic Nuncio to Switzerland; he resigned from the position on 7 Nov 1646.
On 2 Jul 1670, he was appointed during the papacy of Pope Clement X as Titular Archbishop of Rhodus.
He died on 9 Aug 1679.

References

External links and additional sources
 (for Chronology of Bishops) 
 (for Chronology of Bishops) 
 (for Chronology of Bishops) 
 (for Chronology of Bishops) 
 (for Chronology of Bishops) 
 (for Chronology of Bishops) 

17th-century Italian Roman Catholic bishops
Bishops appointed by Pope Urban VIII
Bishops appointed by Pope Clement X
1595 births
1679 deaths
People from Savona
Theatine bishops
Apostolic Nuncios to Switzerland